Al Ramsay Shield is an annual international men's basketball series played between the Australian Boomers and the New Zealand Tall Blacks. The competition is played in conjunction with the FIBA Oceania Championship.

The trophy is named after Australian basketball legend Alastair Ramsay, who was inducted into the Hall of Fame in 2004, and elevated to Legend by the Hall of Fame Honours Committee in 2006.

Series winners 
Results highlighted in blue are Oceania Championship Series, with the exception of the 2006 series, which adds an extra game on top of the regular three-game Al Ramsay Shield series. Those which aren't highlighted are general Al Ramsay Shield series.

See also 
 FIBA Oceania
 FIBA Oceania Championship
 Australia men's national basketball team
 New Zealand men's national basketball team

External links
 FIBA Oceania official website
 Aussie Hoops

Basketball competitions in Oceania between national teams
International basketball competitions hosted by New Zealand
International basketball competitions hosted by Australia
New Zealand men's national basketball team
Australia men's national basketball team